Woman I is an Abstract Expressionist painting by American artist Willem de Kooning. The work is in the collection of the Museum of Modern Art, in New York.

History
Willem de Kooning painted Woman I over two years, from 1950 to 1952. He executed numerous preliminary studies before beginning the painting, starting over several times.

Woman I is one of six canvases representing women, painted in a similar style.

References

External links
 Willem de Kooning, Woman, I Smarthistory, 2016
 Willem de Kooning, Woman, I (from MoMA) Khan Academy

1950 paintings
Paintings by Willem de Kooning
Portraits of women
Paintings in the collection of the Museum of Modern Art (New York City)